Art Toronto, previously known as the Toronto International Art Fair, is an international contemporary art exhibition held each year in Toronto, Ontario, Canada at the Metro Toronto Convention Centre since 2000. Since its inception, it has grown to become the pre-eminent forum for displaying contemporary art in Canada, with exhibitors from around the world. It is Canada's oldest and largest international art fair.

Art Toronto features commercial galleries from Canada and around the world and includes talks and daily tours. After two years of hybrid and virtual programming during the pandemic, the fair returned to the Metro Toronto Convention Centre in 2022, and, as of 2022, is directed by Mia Nielsen.

References

External links 
 

Festivals in Toronto
Art exhibitions in Canada
Art fairs